The men's shot put at the 2014 IPC Athletics European Championships was held at the Swansea University Stadium from 18–23 August.

Medalists

Results

F12

F20

F32

F33

F34

F35

F36

F37

F38

F41

F42

F44

F47

F53/54/55

F57

See also
List of IPC world records in athletics

References

shot put
Shot put at the World Para Athletics European Championships